Karl van Schoor (1925 – unknown) was a Belgian chess player, Belgian Chess Championship winner (1970).

Biography
Karl van Schoor was one of Belgium's leading chess players form the early 1950s to the early 1970s. In 1970, in Ghent he won Belgian Chess Championship.

Karl van Schoor played for Belgium in the Chess Olympiads:
 In 1950, at first reserve board in the 9th Chess Olympiad in Dubrovnik (+0, =0, -2),
 In 1958, at third board in the 13th Chess Olympiad in Munich (+3, =7, -6),
 In 1960, at fourth board in the 14th Chess Olympiad in Leipzig (+5, =7, -3),
 In 1970, at first reserve board in the 19th Chess Olympiad in Siegen (+2, =7, -3).

References

External links

Karl Van Schoor chess games at 365chess.com

1925 births
Year of death missing
Belgian chess players
Chess Olympiad competitors
20th-century chess players